Halolactibacillus alkaliphilus is a Gram-positive, facultative anaerobic, moderately alkaliphilic, halophilic and non-motile bacterium from the genus of Halolactibacillus which has been isolated from sediments from the Xiarinaoer soda lake from the Mongolia.

References

External links
Type strain of Halolactibacillus alkaliphilus at BacDive -  the Bacterial Diversity Metadatabase

Bacillaceae
Bacteria described in 2008